Sir Claude Hamilton Archer Hill  (1866 – 1934) was Lieutenant Governor of the Isle of Man.

Career
Educated at St Mark's School in Windsor and Emmanuel College, Cambridge, Hill joined the Indian Civil Service in 1887. After a posting as Under Secretary to the Government of India (Home Department) from 1895, he was appointed successively First Assistant Resident at Hyderabad in 1897, Private Secretary to the Governor of Bombay in 1900 and then Deputy Secretary to the Government of India (Foreign Department) in 1903. His later appointments included political secretary to the Governor of Bombay in 1906, then Resident at Mewar and after that, Agent to the Governor at Kathiawar. Later he became a member of the Executive Council of Bombay and subsequently, Finance Member of the Viceroy's Executive Council and Head of the Central Transport and Food Board of India. He retired in 1921.

In retirement he became Director-General of the League of Red Cross Societies and then Lieutenant Governor of the Isle of Man.

Family
In 1892 he married Frances May West; they had a son and two daughters.

References

|-

1866 births
1934 deaths
Knights Commander of the Order of the Star of India
Companions of the Order of the Indian Empire
Lieutenant Governors of the Isle of Man
Alumni of Emmanuel College, Cambridge